The  is a professional golf tournament on the Japan Golf Tour. First played in 1963, it is one of the tour's four major championships. Since 1995, it has been held at the Tokyo Yomiuri Country Club in Inagi, Tokyo.

History
From its inception in 1963 to 1972 the field was limited to the winners of six important tournaments in Japan: Japan Open, Japan PGA Championship, Kansai Open, Kansai Pro Championship, Kanto Open and Kanto Pro Championship. In some years a player won two of these event and the field was reduced further, to five.

It has recently been one of the season ending events on the tour with a limited field consisting of the top 30 players from the money list and that seasons tournament winners.

Since 1998 the tournament has been titled the Golf Nippon Series JT Cup, under a sponsorship agreement with Japan Tobacco. It was sponsored by Hitachi from 1988 to 1997, during which time it was titled the Golf Nippon Series Hitachi Cup.

Prize money
Since 2009 the prize money has been ¥130,000,000, with ¥40,000,000 going to the winner, except in 2011 when the event was reduced to 54 holes and prize money was reduced by 25%. In 1988 prize money was ¥50,000,000, with ¥14,000,000 for the winner, increasing to ¥60,000,000, with ¥15,000,000 winner from 1989 to 1992. From 1993 to 2008 prize money was ¥100,000,000, with ¥30,000,000 for the winner.

Tournament hosts

From 1963 to 1990 the event was played at two venues, one near Ozaki and another near Tokyo. The first two rounds were played at one venue and, after a travel day, the remaining two rounds were played at the second venue.

Winners

Sources:

Notes

References

External links

Coverage on Japan Golf Tour's official site

Japan Golf Tour events
Golf tournaments in Japan
Sports competitions in Tokyo
Recurring sporting events established in 1963
1963 establishments in Japan